A landing operation is a military operation during which a landing force, usually utilizing landing craft, is transferred to land with the purpose of power projection ashore. With the proliferation of aircraft, a landing may refer to amphibious forces, airborne forces, or a combination of both.

Naval landing
In a military invasion conducted by sea, the landing and establishment of a beachhead is a critical phase.
In the Iliad, the landing operation of the Achaean navy is described in book three. Since the Trojans had been warned of the invasion, the beach was defended. In Greek polytheism, the ἱερά ἐπιβατήρια were sacrifices offered to the gods after a successful landing.  A λόγος ἐπιβατήριον was a dignified speech delivered upon disembarkation, contrasting with an ἀποβατήριον (apobaterion), the speech delivered upon departure.

During World War II, landing operations were used to great effect during the Normandy landings and Allied invasion of Sicily in the Western Front, and across the Pacific through leapfrogging during the Pacific War. Later landing operations during the Cold War included the 1950 Battle of Inchon during the Korean War, the 1961 Bay of Pigs Invasion, and the 1983 United States invasion of Grenada.

Aerial landing
Missions of air landing troops, as defined by the U.S. FM 100–5 Operations manual, include seizing and holding, or otherwise exploiting, important tactical localities or installations, in conjunction with or pending the arrival of other military or naval forces. Such missions include seizure and clearance of landing fields, beachheads, strong points, and ports; seizure of essential observation or other critical terrain; severing hostile lines of communication and supply; the destruction of bridges, locks, public utility enterprises, and other designated demolitions; seizure of river crossings, defiles, and other bottlenecks; blocking a hostile counterattack; interrupting the movements of hostile reserves; cooperating in the pursuit or breakthrough by ground forces by operating against enemy reserves and lines of communication, and blocking hostile avenues of retreat; and preventing the enemy from destroying essential installations, supplies, and materiel. It also may includes executing an envelopment from the air in conjunction with an attack by ground forces, execution of surprise attacks as a diversion or feint in connection with other air landing or ground operations, or to create confusion and disorder among the hostile military and civilian personnel. Air landing can also provide an attack against an isolated enemy position, impossible or impracticable of attack by ground forces.

See also
Airhead (warfare)
Beach group
Bridgehead
Landing (water transport)
Normandy landings

References
U.S. War Department, manual FM 100-5, Operations, 1941

Maneuver tactics
Naval warfare tactics